Cow Town is a 1950 American Western film directed by John English and written by Gerald Geraghty. The film stars Gene Autry, Gail Davis, Harry Shannon, Jock Mahoney, Clark Burroughs and Harry Harvey Sr. The film was released on May 19, 1950, by Columbia Pictures.

Plot

Cast
Gene Autry as Gene Autry
Gail Davis as Ginger Kirby
Harry Shannon as Sandy Reeves
Jock Mahoney as Tod Jeffreys 
Clark Burroughs as Duke Kirby 
Harry Harvey Sr. as Sheriff Steve Calhoun
Steve Darrell as Chet Hilliard
Sandy Sanders as Stormy Jones
Ralph Sanford as Martin Dalrymple
Robert Hilton as Miller
Bud Osborne as George Copeland 
House Peters Jr. as Gill Saunders
Chuck Roberson as Mike Grady
Champion as Champ

References

External links
 

1950 films
American Western (genre) films
1950 Western (genre) films
Columbia Pictures films
Films directed by John English
American black-and-white films
1950s English-language films
1950s American films